The Tata Memorial Hospital is situated in Parel, Mumbai, in India. Also popularly known as TMH. It is a specialist cancer treatment and research centre, closely associated with the Advanced Centre for Treatment, Research and Education in Cancer (ACTREC). The centre is the national comprehensive cancer centre for the prevention, treatment, education and research in cancer and is recognized as one of the leading cancer centres in this part of the world. It is an autonomous body funded and controlled by Department of Atomic Energy, Government of India which also oversees the administration of institute since 1962.

The Tata Memorial Hospital was initially commissioned by the Sir Dorabji Tata Trust on 28 February 1941 as a center with enduring value and a mission for concern for the Indian people. Current Director of the hospital is Dr. Rajendra A Badwe, who took over from for director Dr. K. A. Dinshaw.

History

The Tata Memorial Hospital was founded by the Sir Dorabji Tata Trust on 28 February 1941. In 1952 the Indian Cancer Research Centre was established as a pioneer research institute for basic research—later called the Cancer Research Institute (CRI). In 1957 the Ministry of Health took over the Tata Memorial Hospital. The transfer of the administrative control of the Tata Memorial Centre (Tata Memorial Hospital & Cancer Research Institute) to the Department of Atomic Energy in 1962 was the next major milestone. The Tata Memorial Hospital and Cancer Research Institute merged as the two arms of the Tata Memorial Centre (TMC) in 1966 as a classic example of private philanthropy augmented by Government support with a mandate for Service, Education & Research in cancer.

Patient care
The Department of Surgical Oncology provides minimal access surgeries, skull-base procedures, major vascular replacements, limb salvage, microvascular surgery and robotic surgeries. The department conducts investigator-initiated and sponsored research  
studies. Staff members contribute chapters to various books and author numerous publications in international peer reviewed journals. The department trains national and international residents and fellows providing exposure to basic and advanced surgical techniques and hands on courses in collaboration with external clinical labs.

One of the fields of specialization of this hospital is in the treatment of acute lymphoblastic leukemia (A.L.L). Every year nearly 30,000 new patients visit the clinics from all over India and neighboring countries. Nearly 60% of these cancer patients receive primary care at the Hospital of which over 70% are treated almost free of any charges. Over 1,000 patients attend the OPD daily for medical advice or for follow-up treatment. During the year 2003, over 20,000 new cases were registered in addition to over 13,000 Referral Cards issued for only special investigations. Nearly 8,500 major operations are performed annually and 5,000 patients treated with Radiotherapy and Chemotherapy annually in multi-disciplinary programmes delivering established treatments.

The TMH was the first Centre in the country to initiate Bone Marrow Transplant in 1983. PET-CT scanner has been procured to make this technology available for cancer management. In an effort to provide access to patients and their families who lack access or the means to visit the hospital, TMH has started an initiative to provide an online expert opinion through Navya.

Preventive oncology
The Department of Preventive Oncology which was commissioned in the year 1993, gives a special focus on education in cancer prevention and early detection, cancer screening.
Of the 2–2.5 million cases of cancer in the country, more than 70% of cases are detected late and report for treatment in very advanced stages. The emphasis on early detection would go a long way to dealing with the large numbers as well as to mitigate avoidable suffering and a financial burden.

ACTREC
The Advanced Centre for Treatment, Research, and Education in Cancer (ACTREC) is a new R&D satellite of the Tata Memorial Centre (TMC). It has the mandate to function as a national center for treatment, education, and research in cancer.

ACTREC comprises two arms—a basic research arm constituted by the erstwhile Cancer Research Institute (CRI) which has shifted from the Parel Campus to the new location in August 2002, and a Clinical Research Centre (CRC), The latter comprises a 50-bed research hospital which is equipped with diagnostic and therapeutic facilities. In the first phase, the focus will be on Pediatric Oncology and emerging therapies, including gene therapy.

Research investigations at CRI currently focus on molecular mechanisms responsible for the causation of major human cancers relevant to India. It is envisaged that in the future, ACTREC will play a greater role in drug development and emerging therapies for treatment and prevention of cancer.

The radiotherapy at ACTREC is equipped with a dual-energy linear accelerator, IMRT, stereotactic therapy and HDU-brachytherapy units. The centre is committed to carrying out clinical trials under GCP conditions, including Phase I/II trials for investigational new drugs. In addition, the centre would specialize in cancer genetics including counseling and genetic testing and molecular pathology.

Cancer Research Institute (CRI)
Several studies are ongoing in Cancer Research Institute (CRI), Such as analysis of cytokine profiles and the role of antibodies to the viral proteins E6 and E7 in cervical cancer, cytokine imbalance in lung cancer patients, and the role of urinary cytokines in intravesical BCG therapy in superficial bladder cancer. The biology of HIV-2, the virus which has spread only in India and Africa is being studied in-depth.

Studies on tobacco mediated carcinogenesis have encompassed chemical analysis, Sizeable effort has been directed towards delineation of the mechanisms of chemopreventive action of agents from Indian foods, such as turmeric, tea and grapes, and development of mechanism-based biomarkers of exposure.

The first transgenic mouse in the country, which was made at the institute, hosts a gene for a growth modulator. This mouse is being developed as a model for squamous cell carcinoma. In parallel, newer cell lines useful for cancer research and an expression system for the E6 protein of HPV are being developed. During 2002, scientists at the Institute have obtained extramural support from different funding bodies to the tune of Rs. 100,000,000. Work from the institute has led to 19 publications in peer-reviewed journals. Its current director is Dr. Sudeep Gupta

Tata Clinic
A 12-story block "The Tata Clinic and Faculty Block" has recently been constructed on the premises vacated by the CRI. This facility will house site specialty clinics, 50 additional beds, Minor theatre complex, daycare beds, academic offices, postgraduate education, seminar rooms, and a Telemedicine Centre. It is renamed as "Homi Bhabha Block"

Education
The Tata Memorial Centre is a recognised training centre for cancer education and research by national and international organisations such as WHO, IAEA and UICC. Tata Memorial Hospital is a post-graduate teaching centre and is affiliated to the University of Mumbai, National Board of Examinations and Maharashtra University of Health Sciences. Every year about 80 post-graduate students register with the centre for doing their Master's or Doctorate courses. There are about 400 students undergoing training every year in medical and non-medical fields in long and short term courses.

Digital Library
The Library of the Tata Memorial Hospital has been maintained since the inception of the hospital. It was relocated on 17 November 2000, on the ground floor of the main building now known as Digital Library. It caters to the needs of clinicians, nurses, other paramedical staff, medical administrators, and visitors from other hospitals, health care industries, academic institutions from all over the country.

Konark Cancer Foundation 
Set up by the Neurosurgeon, B. K. Misra, Cardiac surgeon, Ramakanta Panda and former Police Commissioner of Mumbai, Arup Patnaik,  Konark Cancer Foundation is an NGO for patients coming to the Tata Memorial Hospital for treatment, providing them with financial support of up to INR 1 lac per patient, logistical support such as finding food and shelter for their attendants, providing other voluntary support, collecting and donating blood, medications and prosthesis. Around 10,000 patients and their families have been benefited since its inception.

References

External links
 Official website
 Advanced Centre for Treatment, Research and Education in Cancer (ACTREC)

Hospitals in Mumbai
Cancer hospitals
Tata institutions
Medical research institutes in India
Regional Cancer Centres in India
Research institutes in Mumbai
Homi Bhabha National Institute
1941 establishments in India
Hospitals established in 1941